Ernesto Valverde Tejedor (born 9 February 1964) is a Spanish football manager and former player who played as a forward. He is the current manager of La Liga club Athletic Bilbao.

Over ten seasons, he amassed La Liga totals of 264 games and 68 goals, adding 55 matches and nine goals in Segunda División. He played for six teams in a 14-year professional career, including Espanyol, Barcelona and Athletic Bilbao.

Valverde later went on to have an extensive spell as a manager, including being in charge of all three clubs. He won the double with Olympiacos in 2008–09 and 2011–12, and Barcelona in 2017–18.

Playing career
Valverde was born in the village of Viandar de la Vera, Province of Cáceres, Extremadura. After making his professional debut in Segunda División – Deportivo Alavés and Sestao Sport Club– he was transferred to RCD Español in 1986, making his La Liga debut on 31 August in a 1–1 away draw against Atlético Madrid. In a season that included a second stage he ended with 43 league appearances, scoring seven goals; in his final year, he was part of the squad that lost the 1988 UEFA Cup on penalties to Bayer 04 Leverkusen.

Subsequently, Valverde played two years at FC Barcelona, winning a Copa del Rey and a UEFA Cup Winners' Cup, although he appeared sparingly in the process (only 13 minutes against Lech Poznań in the latter tournament). However, in his second season he netted six times in only 12 games, including braces in consecutive wins over Sporting de Gijón (2–0) and Valencia CF (2–1).

Valverde left for Athletic Bilbao in 1990, being eligible although he was born in Extremadura (he moved to the Basque Country while still an infant). He played six seasons with the team, scoring 20 league goals from 1992 to 1994 before moving to RCD Mallorca, where he was relatively used as the Balearic Islands club achieved top-flight promotion, and retired the following summer aged 33; during his time at Athletic, he was nicknamed Txingurri (Basque for ant).

Valverde played once for Spain, appearing 20 minutes in a 2–1 UEFA Euro 1992 qualifier win against Iceland on 10 October 1990, in Seville.

Coaching career

Spain and Greece

Immediately after retiring, Valverde began his career as a manager in the youth departments of former club Athletic Bilbao. Four years later he became a co-trainer in the main squad and, in 2002, he again acted as head coach when he took over the B side, being promoted to first-team duties the following year; in 2003–04, they finished fifth and qualified for the UEFA Cup.

After one year out of football, Valverde joined another old acquaintance, Espanyol. During his first season, the Catalans managed to reach another UEFA Cup final – 19 years later – again losing on penalties, to fellow Spaniards Sevilla FC.

On 28 May 2008, Valverde was appointed coach at Super League Greece club Olympiacos FC, winning the championship in his debut campaign and adding the cup for the double. On 8 May 2009, it decided not to renew his contract in spite of his success, because of a financial disagreement; however, most of the players and fans were openly in favour of him staying.

On 2 June 2009, Villarreal CF announced that Valverde would succeed Manuel Pellegrini on a one-year deal, after the Chilean had left for Real Madrid. As the team stood tenth in the league on 31 January 2010, he was dismissed following a 0–2 home loss against CA Osasuna.

Valverde returned to Olympiacos on 7 August 2010, as a replacement for Ewald Lienen who had only been in charge for a few weeks. In the first season in his second spell he again led the Piraeus side to the league championship, also reaching the last eight in the domestic cup.

On 19 April 2012, after helping Olympiacos renew its league supremacy, Valverde announced his decision to leave due to family reasons. On 3 December he returned to Spanish football by being appointed at Valencia until the end of the campaign, replacing the fired Mauricio Pellegrino; his first game occurred five days later, a 1–0 win at Osasuna, and the second match, against the same opponent for the Spanish cup, brought another triumph at the Reyno de Navarra (2–0).

Return to Athletic Bilbao

On 1 June 2013, immediately after the 4–3 away loss to Sevilla which meant Valencia could only finish fifth, thus out of qualification positions for the UEFA Champions League, Valverde announced he would leave the club. He returned to Athletic Bilbao on the 20th, qualifying for the Champions League in his first year and also reaching the final of the 2015 Spanish Cup.

On 17 August 2015, Valverde led the Lions to their first trophy in 31 years after a 5–1 aggregate defeat of Barcelona for the Supercopa de España. He declared on 23 May 2017 he would be stepping down on 30 June, to be replaced by former Athletic teammate José Ángel Ziganda.

Valverde's 306 matches in charge of the team over two spells set a club record, beating the previous total of 289 set by Javier Clemente. He also surpassed Clemente's 211 league matches managed, finishing on 228, but was unable to match his record of victories: The latter won 141 games – 102 in the league – while the former came up one short, with 140 and 101; additionally, he was on the bench for 42 European matches, another record.

Barcelona
On 29 May 2017, Valverde replaced Luis Enrique as the new Barcelona manager. His spell began with defeat as rivals Real Madrid won both legs of the Spanish Super Cup at the season's outset. However, the team then went on a 29-match unbeaten run in all competitions from 20 August 2017 until 17 January 2018, when they lost to Espanyol in the first leg of the quarter-finals of the Spanish Cup (also the club's first defeat at the RCDE Stadium, home of their neighbours, since its 2009 opening). They recovered to progress in that tie as part of another sequence of 15 matches without defeat, before a loss to A.S. Roma in the quarter-finals of the UEFA Champions League on 10 April, with the 3–0 defeat meaning the Italians progressed on the away goals rule.

Barcelona remained undefeated for 43 matches in the Spanish League only to lose in their penultimate game of the campaign on 13 May 2018, having rested Lionel Messi for the trip to Levante UD – they were beaten 5–4 by the hosts. They finished with a league and cup double, defeating Sevilla 5–0 in the Copa del Rey final.

The 2018–19 season began with a 2–1 victory over Sevilla to win the domestic supercup. In February 2019 Valverde signed a new one-year contract extension, as they went on a 23-match unbeaten streak and secured a second consecutive league title under him in April following a victory over Levante. He led his team to their first Champions League semi-final after a gap of three years, winning 3–0 at home against Liverpool but being eliminated after a 4–0 defeat at Anfield in the second leg, leading many to call for his dismissal. He also guided the side to another Spanish Cup final, this time losing 2–1 to Valencia.

Valverde remained in charge for the start of 2019–20. Despite the team winning their Champions League group and being top of the league table by the new year on goal difference, poor performances and a period in December and January that saw them win only one in five matches meant his position once again came under pressure. On 13 January 2020, he was dismissed by the club, with his last game being a 3–2 defeat to Atlético Madrid in the Supercopa de España; he was replaced by former Real Betis coach Quique Setién, with Barcelona ending the campaign without a trophy after finishing five points behind Real Madrid.

Third spell at Athletic
On 30 June 2022, Valverde returned to Athletic for a third spell, under new president Jon Uriarte.

Personal life
Valverde is a keen photographer, whose work has been published and exhibited. His younger brother, Mikel, is a cartoonist.

Managerial statistics

Honours

Player
Espanyol
UEFA Cup runner-up: 1987–88

Barcelona
Copa del Rey: 1989–90
European Cup Winners' Cup: 1988–89

Manager
Espanyol
UEFA Cup runner-up: 2006–07

Olympiacos
Super League Greece: 2008–09, 2010–11, 2011–12
Greek Football Cup: 2008–09, 2011–12

Athletic Bilbao
Supercopa de España: 2015

Barcelona
La Liga: 2017–18, 2018–19
Copa del Rey: 2017–18
Supercopa de España: 2018

Individual
Super League Greece Manager of the Year: 2010–11, 2011–12
UEFA La Liga Coach of the Year: 2015–16
La Liga Manager of the Month: January 2014, November 2014, March 2015, October 2015, September 2016

References

External links

Athletic Bilbao coach profile

1964 births
Living people
Sportspeople from the Province of Cáceres
Spanish footballers
Footballers from Extremadura
Footballers from Vitoria-Gasteiz
Association football forwards
La Liga players
Segunda División players
Segunda División B players
Deportivo Alavés players
Sestao Sport Club footballers
RCD Espanyol footballers
FC Barcelona players
Athletic Bilbao footballers
RCD Mallorca players
Spain under-21 international footballers
Spain under-23 international footballers
Spain international footballers
Basque Country international footballers
Spanish football managers
La Liga managers
Segunda División B managers
Athletic Bilbao B managers
Athletic Bilbao managers
RCD Espanyol managers
Villarreal CF managers
Valencia CF managers
FC Barcelona managers
Super League Greece managers
Olympiacos F.C. managers
Spanish expatriate football managers
Expatriate football managers in Greece
Spanish expatriate sportspeople in Greece
Athletic Bilbao non-playing staff